Harbour Energy plc is an independent oil and gas company based in Edinburgh, Scotland. It is the United Kingdom's largest independent oil and gas business. It is listed on the London Stock Exchange and is a constituent of the FTSE 250 Index.

History 
The company was established by the commodity trader, Noble Group, and the private-equity firm, EIG Global Energy Partners, in July 2014. The initial funding was US$150 million from Noble Group and $50 million from EIG Global Energy Partners. The company provided financial backing for Chrysaor Holdings to acquire assets valued at US$3.8bn from Royal Dutch Shell; the backing led to the company becoming the largest shareholder in Chrysaor Holdings.

In June 2020, the company announced the provision of backing to enable Chrysaor Holdings to acquire Premier Oil. In March 2021 the company merged Chrysaor Holdings and Premier Oil and absorbed both into Harbour Energy. It was announced that the merged business would be managed by Linda Cooke, who had been CEO of Harbour Energy since it was established. The transaction also made Harbour Energy the UK's largest independent oil and gas business.

In 2023, the Indonesia oil and gas regulator SKK Migas approved the first plan of development for the Tuna offshore gas field, operated by Harbour Energy, with a total estimated investment of $3 billion.

References

External links
 Official site

Oil and gas companies of the United Kingdom
Companies listed on the London Stock Exchange
Companies based in Edinburgh
Companies established in 2014